"High on My Own Supply" is a 2020 single by Australian rock band, Wolfmother. The song was released on 10 June 2020 through Middle Man Records.

The song marked a drastic departure from the band's hard rock and psychedelic rock song, as the song embraced a more electronic dance music sound. Critically, the song was universally panned.

Style 
Unlike much of Wolfmother's previous work which has been described as neo-psychedelia, stoner rock, and hard rock, "High on My Own Supply" showcases an electronic-oriented sound. Josh Martin of, NME described it as an EDM-inspired track. Jason Heffler of EDM.com compared the song to MGMT, calling it a future bass song.

David Durán, of Mexican entertainment website Frecuencia Indigo, compared the track to the Chainsmokers, saying that Stockdale "explores a totally revamped sound in which synths and a more futuristic rhythmic base are imposed".

Critical reception 
Describing the overall fan reaction, Josh Martin of NME said the track's reaction "across social media from longtime fans of the band's nostalgic rock sound has been markedly negative".

References

External links 
 

2020 singles
2020 songs
Wolfmother songs
Electronic dance music songs
Future bass songs